Jewish Cemetery can refer to:

Jewish cemetery, a burial place for Jewish people
The Jewish Cemetery, a 1650s painting by Jacob van Ruisdael

See also
Jewish Cemetery (Port Gibson, Mississippi)
Jewish Cemetery (Währing)
Jewish cemetery of Besançon
Jewish Cemetery of Coro
Jewish Cemetery (Khotyn)
Jewish cemeteries of Warsaw
Jewish Cemetery (Roßau)
Jewish cemetery in Chernivtsi
Jewish Cemetery (Beirut)
Jewish Cemetery (Worms)
Old Jewish Cemetery (Prague)
New Jewish Cemetery (Prague)
Jewish Cemetery (Kleinbardorf)
United Jewish Cemetery
Okopowa Street Jewish Cemetery
Willesden Jewish Cemetery
Liberal Jewish Cemetery, Willesden
Golders Green Jewish Cemetery
Old Jewish cemetery, Chambersburg
West Ham Jewish Cemetery
Old Jewish Cemetery, Cincinnati
Baker Street Jewish Cemeteries
Weißensee Cemetery
Touro Cemetery
Golden Hill Jewish Cemetery
Măeriște
Remuh Cemetery
Mount Zion Cemetery (New York City)
 Baron de Hirsch Cemetery (Halifax), in Halifax, Nova Scotia
 Baron de Hirsch Cemetery (Montreal), in Montreal, Quebec
 Baron Hirsch Cemetery, in Staten Island, New York
Kozma Street Cemetery
Mount Hebron Cemetery (New York City)
Mount Sinai Memorial Park Cemetery
Home of Peace Cemetery
Mikveh Israel Cemetery
Wellwood Cemetery
Innenstadt (Frankfurt am Main)
Pape Avenue Cemetery
Montefiore Cemetery
Westlawn Cemetery
Machpelah Cemetery (Queens, New York)
Jewish cemeteries of Vilnius
Jewish Cemeteries in London
Jewish cemeteries in Ostrów
Jewish Cemetery, Marsa